Głazów may refer to the following places in Poland:

Głazów, Świętokrzyskie Voivodeship
Głazów, West Pomeranian Voivodeship